The 2010–11 Marist Red Foxes men's basketball team represented Marist College during the 2010–11 NCAA Division I men's basketball season. The Red Foxes, led by third year head coach Chuck Martin, played their home games at the McCann Center and were members of the Metro Atlantic Athletic Conference. They finished the season 6–27, 3–15 in MAAC play to finish ninth place. They lost in the quarterfinals of the MAAC tournament to Fairfield.

Previous season 
The Red Foxes finished the 2009–10 season 1–29, 1–17 in MAAC play to finish in last place. As the No. 10 seed in the MAAC tournament, they lost in the first round to Canisius.

Roster

Schedule and results

|-
!colspan=9 style=| Regular season

|-
!colspan=9 style=| MAAC tournament

References

Marist
Marist Red Foxes men's basketball seasons
Marist Red Foxes men's basketball
Marist Red Foxes men's basketball